Karen Schweers Cook (born July 25, 1946, in Austin, Texas) is an American sociologist and the Ray Lyman Wilbur Professor of Sociology at Stanford University.

In 2004 Cook received the Cooley-Mead Award for Distinguished Scholarship from the American Sociological Association.  In 2007 Cook was elected as a fellow of the  American Association for the Advancement of Science for her  work on social exchange theory, social networks and trust.

Education
Karen Cook attended Stanford University, and spent two semesters at Harlaxton Manor in the English Midlands as part of the Stanford in Britain program. She received her B.A. with honors (1968), M.A. (1970), and Ph.D. (1973) in Sociology from Stanford.

Career
From 1972-1995, Cook  was a professor of sociology at the University of Washington (UW) in Seattle, Washington. She rose from acting assistant professor to become a full professor in 1985, and served as chair of the UW sociology department  for 1993-1995.
There she collaborated with Richard Marc Emerson and developed the first computer-based laboratory for the study of social exchange.

From 1995-1998 Cook was the James B. Duke Professor of Sociology and director of the Laboratory for Social Research at Duke University.

Cook joined the faculty of Stanford University in 1998 as the Ray Lyman Wilbur Professor of Sociology. 
Cook was the founding director of the Institute for Research in the Social Sciences (IRiSS), which was formed at Stanford in 2004.
She also served as senior associate dean for the social sciences from 2001-2005, and as chair of the sociology department from 2005-2010.  
Cook has served in the Stanford University Faculty Senate as a senator (2005-2007), a member of the senate steering committee (2006-2008) and as chair of the senate (2008-2009).
In 2010 Cook was appointed as the vice provost for faculty development and diversity  (VPFDD) at Stanford, serving in the role until September 30, 2019.

Cook has been elected to the American Academy of Arts and Sciences (1996), the American Association for the Advancement of Science (2007), and the National Academy of Sciences (2007). 
She was elected to the American Philosophical Society in 2018.

Cook is a past president of the Pacific Sociological Association (1990-1991) and a former vice president of  the International Institute of Sociology (1992-1993) and the American Sociological Association (1994-1995). 
She was named to the Russell Sage Foundation Board of Trustees in 2012.

She has edited or co-edited a number of books in the Russell Sage Foundation Trust Series including 
Trust in Society (2001), 
Trust and Distrust in Organizations: Emerging Perspectives (2004), 
eTrust: Forming Relations in the Online World (2009), and 
Whom Can Your Trust? (2009). 
She is a co-author of Cooperation without Trust? (2005).
Cook is a co-editor of the Annual Review of Sociology. She is also the Chairperson of the Annual Reviews Board of Directors.

Cook received the Cooley-Mead Award for Distinguished Scholarship from the American Sociological Association in 2004.

References

External links

1946 births
Living people
American sociologists
American women sociologists
Stanford University alumni
Stanford University faculty
University of Washington faculty
Duke University faculty
Fellows of the American Association for the Advancement of Science
Fellows of the American Academy of Arts and Sciences
Members of the United States National Academy of Sciences
Members of the American Philosophical Society
Annual Reviews (publisher) editors
21st-century American women